Chahar Takab (also Romanized as Chahār Takāb; also known as Chahār Ţāq and Chehār Tāgu) is a village in Qalandarabad Rural District, Qalandarabad District, Fariman County, Razavi Khorasan Province, Iran. At the 2006 census, its population was 238, in 61 families.

References 

Populated places in Fariman County